Farmington Public Schools is a public school district headquartered in Farmington, Michigan, in southern Oakland County in Greater Detroit. As of the 2020–2021 school year, the district serves 8,995 students. It provides services for students in Farmington, Farmington Hills, and a portion of West Bloomfield. The district has a total staff of 1,380, making it the second largest employer in the Farmington-Farmington Hills area.

History
In 2008, as part of the Mackinac Center for Public Policy "Show Michigan the Money" project, the district began publicly posting its check registers on the internet.

Robert Herrera became superintendent in May 2019. In December 2020 he announced he would resign effective January 22, 2021. Shelby Tankersley of Hometownlife.com (printed by Detroit Free Press) wrote that "early every board member lamented the loss of Herrera's leadership, saying he has been a strong superintendent in his short time in the role."

Schools

High schools

Farmington High School (Farmington)
North Farmington High School (Farmington Hills)
Farmington Central High School (alternative high school) (Farmington Hills)

Middle schools
 East Middle School
 Power Middle School
 Warner Middle School

Elementary schools
 Beechview Elementary School
 Forest Elementary School
 Gill Elementary School
 Hillside Elementary School
 Kenbrook Elementary School
 Lanigan Elementary School
 Longacre Elementary School
 Wood Creek Elementary School

K-8 Schools
Farmington STEAM Academy
There is also a newly renovated and expanded Early Childhood Center: Farmington Early Childhood Center (FECC). FECC is NAEYC accredited and the only early childhood center in the Farmington/Farmington Hills community that holds this distinction.
There is Our Lady of Sorrows, a K-8 catholic school. Visions Unlimited is a school for young adults with special needs.

Early Childhood Centers
Farmington Early Childhood Center

Former Schools

Farmington Junior High, 33300 Thomas St, Farmington, MI 48336
Isaac Bond Elementary School 1926-1974
Cloverdale Elementary School
O.E. Dunckel Middle School
Eagle Elementary School
Fairview Elementary School
Farmington Community School
Flanders Elementary School
Harrison High School
Highmeadow Common Campus
Larkshire Elementary School (Renamed to Lanigan)
Maxfield Training Center
Middlebelt Elementary School
Shiawassee Elementary School
Ten Mile Elementary School
William Grace Elementary School
Woodale Elementary School

Academic Performance
Academic performance in the Farmington Public School system has generally matched or exceeded the state average.

High school standardized test scores
Michigan provides data on the historical ACT testing performance for the district, as well as the individual high schools. Scores from North Farmington and Farmington compare favorably against the national ACT composite average, and scores from Harrison compare roughly to the composite average for the state. The full data set appears below:

Accreditation
Farmington Public Schools are all accredited by the North Central Association Commission on Accreditation and School Improvement. Farmington Early Childhood Center is accredited by the National Association for the Education of Young Children.

Farmington Public Schools students are tested through various approaches to measure student achievement. Standardized test include the MEAP (Michigan Educational Assessment Program) and nationally the ACT.

Farmington Public High Schools ranked among Newsweeks top 1,200 public high schools in the country based on number of advanced placement classes and graduating seniors.

Farmington High School ranked 813.
North Farmington High School ranked 1112.
Harrison High School ranked 1190.

Sixty-eight percent of teachers in the Farmington Public Schools District hold advanced degrees.

Athletic honors
Harrison High School football coach John Herrington and the Harrison Hawks football team was honored by Nike for having one of the top 50 football programs in the country.

References

External links

Farmington Public Schools Official site.

School districts in Michigan
Education in Oakland County, Michigan
Farmington Hills, Michigan
Farmington, Michigan